Antonio Trivulzio the Younger (It.:Antonio Trivulzio, iuniore) (d. 1559) was an Italian Roman Catholic bishop and cardinal.

Biography

Antonio Trivulzio was born in Milan ca. 1514, the son of Gerolamo Teodoro Trviulzio and Antonia da Barbiano.  He was the nephew of Cardinal Scaramuccia Trivulzio and the cousin of Cardinal Agostino Trivulzio.

He studied law in Milan.  On 7 June 1535 he was elected to be Bishop of Toulon.  He traveled to Rome where he became a referendary of the Apostolic Signatura and domestic prelate of His Holiness ca. 1539.  From 1544 to 1547 he served as vice-legate in Avignon.  He opposed allowing Protestants to settle in Comtat Venaissin and supported the King of France's expulsion of Protestants from Cabrières-d'Avignon and Mérindol.  He was vice-legate in Perugia from 1549 to June 1550.  On 25 April 1550 he was made nuncio for the Kingdom of France.

Pope Paul IV made him a cardinal priest in the consistory of 15 March 1557.  On 18 May 1557 he was named legate a latere to the Republic of Venice.  He was given the red hat and the titular church of Santi Giovanni e Paolo on 11 October 1557.  On 20 September 1557 he was named legate a latere to the Kingdom of France in order to negotiate peace between Henry II of France and Philip II of Spain; this mission ended successfully with the signing of the Treaty of Cateau-Cambrésis.

He died of an apoplexy at the Castle of Saint Martin near Paris on 25 June 1559.  He was buried in the chapel of the castle.

References

1559 deaths
16th-century Italian cardinals
Year of birth unknown
Apostolic Nuncios to France
Apostolic Nuncios to the Republic of Venice
16th-century Italian Roman Catholic bishops